Gibson County may refer to:

Gibson County, Indiana
Gibson County, Tennessee

See also
 Gibson County Courthouse (disambiguation)